The 1948 Open Championship was the first time that a tournament was introduced after the challenge system was discontinued. The tournament was held at the Lansdowne Club in London from 8 to 15 March and was open to professionals and amateurs. The first winner of the competition in this format was the defending champion Mahmoud Karim who defeated Jim Dear in a close final lasting 52 minutes.

Results

+ Denotes Amateur

References

Men's British Open Squash Championships
Men's British Open Squash Championship
Men's British Open Squash Championship
Men's British Open Squash Championship
Men's British Open Squash Championship
Squash competitions in London